Lazy Magnolia Brewing Company is an American brewing company based in Kiln, Mississippi.

Brief history
Lazy Magnolia Brewing Company was founded by Mark and Leslie Henderson. Leslie entered the American Brewers Guild Brewing School in July 2003 and followed this up with an apprenticeship at Crescent City Brewhouse in the spring of 2004. A building was secured in September 2004 and brewing equipment was delivered in October and fully running by December. In January 2005, the first batch of beer was brewed on the Lazy Magnolia system. The first kegs of beer hit the market on the Gulf Coast in March 2005. Hurricane Katrina briefly shut down operations and destroyed the couple's home when it hit in September 2005, but the brewery was operating again by October.

By early 2007, the company was selling beer to bars and restaurants in Mississippi. In December 2007, the company began selling bottled beer. Lazy Magnolia Brewing Company has more than 90 types of beer.

Products

Lazy Magnolia's Southern Pecan Nut Brown Ale beer is the first beer in the world commercially made with whole roasted pecans.  

The Indian Summer Spiced Wheat Ale is an American-style wheat ale spiced with orange peel and coriander.

The Jefferson Stout Sweet Potato Cream Stout is brewed with sweet potatoes and lactose (milk sugar). The Southern Gold is Lazy Magnolia's golden honey ale. It is brewed with locally produced honey from Ellisville, Mississippi. It is the company's second recipe designed to recognize a specific location and demographic, Hattiesburg, Mississippi - home of the University of Southern Mississippi whose mascot is the Southern Miss Golden Eagles, hence the Southern Gold name of the beer and the gold and black colors of the bottle labels and carrier.

Gulf Porter was the first in Lazy Magnolia's Brewer's Choice Series. It was predominantly sold in growlers for the 2009 winter season.

Rat infestation
Lazy Magnolia briefly received a C health grade due to a rodent infestation. Rat feces were found in both the taproom kitchen and in the brewing area.

References

External links
Official web site
Mississippi Roads television show about Lazy Magnolia

Beer brewing companies based in Mississippi
Restaurants in Mississippi
American companies established in 2003
Hancock County, Mississippi
Food and drink companies established in 2003
Restaurants established in 2003